Hendrik Tallo (11 September 1893 Tali Parish, Pärnu County – 9 May 1938 Kilingi-Nõmme) was an Estonian politician. He was a member of Estonian National Assembly.

References

1893 births
1938 deaths
Members of the Estonian National Assembly
People from Saarde Parish